Sang Min Leo Whang (November 10, 1962 - ) is a South Korean psychologist, author, and popular political commentator. He has empirically investigated "the Korean Peoples' identity & their mass-psychology" by connecting it to a variety of issues such as self, online world identity, consumption behavior, love & relationships, power desire and political decision making.  He has mainly researched the different psychological types of people and how the human mind works in on and offline settings.  His most well-known projects are WPI (Whang's Personality Inventory), research on the identities of online game players, and research on politicians' public images.  Whang has been a professor at Sejong University from 1994-1997 and at Yonsei University from 1997-2016.  In January 2016, he was dismissed from his position as a tenured professor at Yonsei University, by excuse of violating an ethical rule, 'having a job outside of professorship without the permission of the university president.'  There is controversy and speculation surrounding his dismissal.  The unusual dismissal of a tenured professor from his position was a retaliatory decision made because of Whang's criticism against Geun-hye Park, the 11th President of South Korea.  She was later impeached and dismissed from the presidency. Whang's dismissal was planned and executed by the late president of Yonsei University, Gap Young Cheung who denied his involvement of this case as a president of university. The late president Gap Young Cheung had a strong reputation that he had wished to hold a government or Blue House position during Ms. Park's presidency.  After the impeachment of Ms. Park, Cheung retired from the university and remained as an honorary professor.  Whang's dismissal is appreciated as an example of an evidence of latent oppression on academia by power.  Dr. Whang currently runs a podcast WhangShimSo, where he provides free consultations on personal and career conflicts, and commentates on the diverse social issues in Korean Society.

Early life and family 
He was born as a second child in the town of Jinhae, and lived there until he was 9 years old when his parents decided to move to the bigger city of Pusan for the opportunity to better educate their children.  He has said the thought “I need to do well academically in ordered to be treated like a person” was a motivating factor in his youth to study hard.  In an interview with Chosun Ilbo, he recalled “Once I received grades that put me in 25th place in class and the kids who used to ask me questions during recess stopped asking me any questions.  They would not even reply when I said something.  What was even more surprising was that kids who were known to be physically dominant in the class started bothering me.  It was strange.  So I came in 2nd place in class on the next test.  The teacher told me to stop playing with grades. And the other kids treated me normally again.  This led me to think that in Korean society I need to do well academically in order to be treated properly as a person even before having any idea of what I really want to do.”

Education and academic career

College 

In the spring of 1981, Whang was admitted into Seoul National University's Social Sciences department.  He himself has said it was pure coincidence that he came to major in Psychology.  He initially went to the Social Sciences department in order to become a diplomat, but started to rethink his path after spending his first year of college drinking. It was overwhelming for him to consider majoring in Sociology only to be living in and out of jail afterwards due to the political oppression at the time.  He did not want to live as a person who had to tout himself for someone or something.  He chose psychology because he thought he could quietly study human behavior in a lab instead of having to go on expeditions into remote areas if he had chosen anthropology.  In his second-year of college, he was selected as a scholarship recipient of The Korea Foundation for Advanced Studies and received 50,000 won ($50) per month, an event from which he gained hope and confidence to study abroad and pursue the path of a scholar, which he used to assume would be difficult.  He was determined to go to America and become B.F. Skinner's student after reading Walden II.

Graduate school 

After receiving his BA in psychology in 1985, Sang Min Whang continued his studies at East Graduate School under professor Bong Yeon Suh's guidance.  And in September 1986, he received a scholarship from The Korea Foundation for Advanced Studies to study Social Cognitive Development under Sheldon White's guidance in Harvard University's psychology doctorate program.

The question that continues to be repeated in Sang Min Whang's work since his graduate school days can be summarized as follows: "How are peoples' minds living in a particular society or culture expressed in different ways for each individual?"  His doctoral dissertation "The Organization of Everyday Places and their Dimensional Features: The Priming Effect of Dimensions on the Congruence of Place and Behavior" explored what kind of conceptions people had of everyday places, how the psychological meaning people attribute to places can be measured, and whether the measured results came from absolute characteristics of places or were results of peoples’ responses to places.  In this study, he employed non-parametric statistical analysis, which unlike parametric statistical analysis that presumes a few set patterns exist, uses data to find an unknown pattern.

Since his postdoctoral fellowship, Sang Min Whang focused on the “human mind that operates in the Internet.”  Under the guidance of Rob Kling at University of California, Irvine, he started research on the mind in the PC network environment and was a pioneer in early research on the virtual world.  He accurately predicted that shopping and other real life activities will occur over the Internet and classified the characteristics of the type of person who first finds new electronic products and the characteristics of the consumer that spreads the use of new electronic products.  (Refer to "Digital Freaks Decide Future Consumption")

Academic career and research 

In his life as a researcher, Sang Min Whang delved into the subject of the “self,” especially “identification and respect for an individual’s disposition” based on the study of “Korean Peoples’ Identity.”  In particular, he researched the relationship between “the self oneself perceives” and “the self others perceive,” or the “real self” and the “ideal self” Koreans experience and build in various aspects by connecting it to specific fields in education, development, politics, marketing, etc. He especially asserts that instead of the medical model that defines a student or a child's particular behavior as a “problem” and tries to solve it, the “developmental perspective,” which helps a student or a child understand herself by diagnosing and understanding each individual's character and the meaning each individual attributes to her actions, needs to be applied to education and psychotherapy.

He rejected mainstream psychology that looks for the “average” among people and tried to define the different individual characteristics expressed in a cultural or societal setting and measure these “unknown concepts” using MDS (Multidimensional Scaling).  However, he started to feel there was a fundamental limitation to his research when it could find factors showing quantitative differences exist among individuals, but could not find each individual's characteristic that has its own attributes manifest in different ways from each other, and later used the Q Methodology to overcome this.

Q Methodology Development
In order to find a method that can investigate the characteristics of each individual living in a sociocultural environment instead of assuming an absolute and immutable attribute, Sang Min Whang organized a seminar called “What is Research Methodology?” with his students after starting his post in Yonsei University.  One of the people invited to this seminar was Heung Gyu Kim, a former professor at Hankuk University of Foreign Studies, who introduced Q Methodology to Whang.  Afterwards, Whang studied the different thoughts people had from each other on various topics such as “Internet Psychology,” “Future Electronic Products,” etc.  According to Sang Min Whang, Q Methodology makes it possible to do a quantum-mechanical interpretation of the mind unlike the existing factor analysis that was being used in psychology.  That is, psychology based on the existing R-technique factor analysis defines each factor as an absolute characteristic that everyone has and only differs in the extent, while Q Methodology made it possible to deduce how each factor comes together differently and manifests in different ways according to each individual in different environments.  It applied the fact that like how the subject can be conscious of the observer and decide on its movements and change, an individual can be aware of her environment and her own characteristics to manifest them (Refer to Q Workshop Manual).  Afterwards, Sang Min Whang felt the limitation of interpreting each factor deduced from Q Methodology analysis as one characteristic according to the traditional analysis method.  This was because he thought there was a need to separate the positive, easily shown disposition and the negative or hidden disposition that both appear within a single factor instead of abstractly lumping them together.  In order to overcome this limitation, he divided the statements arranged according to the weight attributed to each statement into high, middle, and low and interpreted them as each different characteristics drawn from one factor.  Afterwards, the middle-ranked statement was excluded because it could not reveal a clear disposition about the relevant factor and one factor was interpreted by being divided into two extreme dispositions shown by the highest-ranked statement and lowest-ranked statement.  This is the principle of “extremes meet” being applied to Q Methodology and by interpreting one factor into two extreme dispositions, not only was it clearer how each disposition shows itself in a studied society and but it also became possible to show each characteristics’ interaction with one another.  In addition, by dividing one factor into two extremes, it was possible to find out in Q Methodology research that proceeds with a comparatively small number of participants not only the disposition that is easily admitted by people or accepted in a societal situation (mainstream), but also the characteristic people are reluctant to show or only a minority of people have (non-mainstream).  This new interpretative method based on Q Methodology is found in a number of Sang Min Whang's research.

Research on Koreans' psychology

WPI (Whang’s Personality Inventory)

Sang Min Whang thought there needs to be a tool differentiated from the western psychology tests to measure “Koreans’ psychology” because Asians and Westerners define and think about “the self” in different ways.  In the field of personality study, the Big 5 Theory of Personality (openness to experience, conscientiousness, extraversion, agreeableness, neuroticism) was already known to exist through Costa & McCrae and others’ research.  However, Sang Min Whang thought these five factors would combine and manifest in different ways depending on the sociocultural environment and an individual's experience and beliefs.  According to the metaphor he uses frequently, it is important to know the fact that “when making bread, the ingredients you need are ‘flour,’ ‘eggs,’ ‘milk,’ ‘yeast,’ and ‘butter.’  But the bread is not the ingredient.  It only becomes bread when you mix the ingredients together to make the dough, proof it, put it in the oven, and bake it.  Likewise, a persons’ mind becomes known not by the score from individual psychological traits or factors, but only after going through a larger frame that can look at those comprehensively.” (<<Reading the Mind (2016), 325p>>
He was able to classify two dimensional types, the self that yourself sees (I), and the self that others see (Me) based on Q Methodology and after constructing many statements indicating Koreans’ emotion, lifestyle, and behavior pattern based on the Big 5 Theory of Personality.  The way Koreans define themselves have been differentiated into 5 types: (I) Realist, Romantist, Humanist, Idealist, and Agent, and the way they define themselves using others as a medium (Me) was differentiated into these 5 types: Relation, Trust, Manual, Self, and Culture.  His findings empirically proved how William James’ theory that the “self” is a combination of “the self that yourself thinks of (I)” and “the self that others see (Me)” manifests itself in a specific sociocultural setting and WPI (Whang's Personality Inventory) has been organized as a personality test that is being used in counseling and education.

WPI's 5 Types
 Realist: A realist tries to have good relationships with other people because he or she acquires his or her sense of being through others’ acknowledgement. She or he is considerate of other people and caters well to others because she or he does not like big changes or conflicts, but also goes through heartache or a “good person complex” as a result.  In any organization, if there is not a lot of conflict within it, it could be due to the work of a realist.  Realists think of the organization they belong to, their wealth, and their academic pedigrees as measures they can use to gain others’ recognition and they also strive for self-improvement in order to live textbook definitions of successful lives, which are decided on by the outside world.
 Romantist: Romantists feel alive when they share their feelings with others.  If a romantist, for whom the sharing of sensibilities and emotions are important, feels that his or her feelings are not appreciated then he or she may have a heart that is the more impoverished than anyone else even though he or she may be living an abundant life.  A romantist's sensibility, delicate like a glass bead, is sometimes also expressed in an artistic sense. Additionally, when working on something new, romantists might appear to be very hesitant because they have a lot of fear and anxiety, but on the contrary, they may also appear to be meticulous and deliberate.
 Humanist: Humanists acquire their sense of being through relationships with people. They are out-going, sociable and friendly.  They have the ability to utilize their personal networks to solve problems.  In contrast, they also show a side where they start off strong and end weak by setting up grand goals without being detailed enough and have difficulty putting in any effort for a long time to achieve said goals.  They think it is a matter-of-course and natural to treat superiors with respect and to appear authoritative to subordinates.  They can be confident in their ability to build relationships, but they have a hard time noticing delicate and subtle feelings.
 Idealist: Idealists acquire their sense of being when they feel free and gain an understanding about the world.  They seek something of their own that is different from others, which gives the impression of being idealistic, abstract, and disconnected from reality. Also, they may appear to another person to be selfish and individualistic at times because idealists are only concerned with what they’re interested in and indifferent to everything else.  They prefer spending time alone and try to live independently.  Idealists can change their interests frequently because they have a lot of curiosity and are creative, but it is important above all else for idealists to become immersed in one thing and build their own expertise.
 Agent: Agents acquire their sense of being through their achievements.  Their work is what they are and they feel a joy greater than anything else when they complete a task in the way they wanted to. They have a tendency to prioritize work above relationships and they do not like someone meddling in their work process.  This is because they enjoy themselves becoming immersed in the process of their work as it progresses as they have planned.  This tendency may also connect to their hobbies.  If they start to approach their hobbies like it is work, they can become scarily absorbed and bring to mind the image of an obsessive-compulsive otaku (geek).

Koreans’ desires and "the Relationship between image and true self"

In "The President and Louis Vuitton", Sang Min Whang thought (luxury good) consumption and elections clearly showed how Koreans’ dress up their desires instead of saying what they want, thinking that if they choose the vaguely “good thing,” it will produce the results they want.  When you make a decision to dress up your desire without being able to distinguish between “what you really want” and “what you are saying you want,” you feel “duped” and cannot be satisfied even after spending money. On the other hand, he suggested “the mind’s MRI,” a development from Q Methodology, for suppliers to use as a method to diagnose the consumer's hidden desire and the desire they freely talk of in a societal setting.

Dismissal from Yonsei University and controversy

Criticism against Geun Hye Park’s Regime and Dismissal from Yonsei University’s full professorship 
In May 2015, Sang Min Whang researched the types of image the public has about the then President Geun Hye Park using Q Methodology and published his findings in the monthly magazine Shin Dong Ah with the title “Foolish Ruler> Face Madame >Our VIP.” According to Whang’s research, people perceived Ms. Park mainly as a “puppet.”  The “puppet” image the majority of people had of Ms. Park was divided into more detailed types: foolish ruler, our VIP, and face Madame.  The study simultaneously found the public expected a president with the image of a “leading hero” as an alternative to Park. This meant the public already knew through her image that Park is incompetent and, at the same time, only a sort of “ceremonious figure” with someone else calling the shots.  She was being perceived as a leader that did not have the ability to govern a nation.

After publishing his “President Geun Hye Park Image” research in Shin Dong Ah magazine, Sang Min Whang was sent to Yonsei University's disciplinary committee for “violation of prohibition on holding a job outside of professorship and violation of prohibition on engaging in commercial activity” and the former Yonsei University president, Gap Young Cheung, who was being mentioned as a potential minister nominee in Geun Hye Park's regime, passed the dismissal motion on his last day in office on January 29, 2016.  Yonsei University has claimed there is no relation between Sang Min Whang's research and the exclusionary disciplinary action and that he was removed because of “holding concurrent offices,” but through the Soon Sil Choi affair it was proven Sang Min Whang's research predicted the hidden commander's existence. The retaliatory decision to dismiss a tenured professor, along with Yoo Ra Chung's illicit admission incident, showed that universities lost academic autonomy and became an instrument of political power.

Professor Ho Geun Lee from Yonsei University, who agreed to an interview with Dong-A Ilbo newspaper, claimed that if Whang had only “violated the prohibition on holding a job outside of professorship and the prohibition on engaging in commercial activity” then he would not have been dismissed and implied that Whang was dismissed because he was negligent in carrying out his duties as a professor. Lee cited examples such as Whang's absence from meetings with professors, scheduling all of his courses to teach on one day during the week, and managing an outside research lab named Wisdom Center even though Whang did a lot of research.  However, it was confirmed Sang Min Whang did not receive any salary or engage in any commercial activity for profit and only conducted research by accepting projects through Wisdom Center.  In Korea and in the U.S., it is difficult for the excuse “holding another office outside of professorship” to be the grounds for dismissal because many professors in both countries establish their own research labs to work more freely on research or they hold offices at companies in related areas of study. Ultimately, according to Lee's interview, Yonsei University presented the reasons that Whang was “negligent” because he did not attend the professor meetings and fit all of his courses into one day to remove a tenured, full professor with satisfactory research performance.  This kind of measure taken by Yonsei University is one of the examples of how people who satirized Geun Hye Park were oppressed under the regime.

Gap Young Cheung, who removed Sang Min Whang from Yonsei University, was one of the figures being mentioned as a nominee for the first chief of staff or the minister of economy under Geun Hye Park's regime, but he unable to take a government post.  Afterwards, he tried for reappointment of Yonsei University's president, but failed after “being ranked as the lowest among potential candidates on performance and qualifications in an opinion gathering session by Yonsei University faculty.”  After the next term (18th) president of Yonsei University was decided to be Yong Hak Kim, the dismissal procedure for Whang progressed quickly.  Gap Young Cheung signed the dismissal resolution on his last day of his president term and announced it is “chance” that the two dates coincide.  Some analyze Gap Young Cheung's removal of Sang Min Whang, who continued to maintain a critical tone of Geun Hye Park's regime on a daily basis, as a move Cheung made to become appointed to public office under Geun Hye Park's regime.  However, Gap Young Cheung claimed in an interview with the press that he “did not know” about Sang Min Hwang's dismissal from Yonsei University's professorship and that he only followed the decision of the disciplinary committee even though he was Yonsei University's president when the dismissal process was in progress.  These actions by Gap Young Cheung along with the illicit admission of Yoo Ra Chung into Ewha University is analyzed as a case of how university personnel have transformed into, not people who pursue learning, but rather agents of political power under Geun Hye Park's regime.

In other instances of abuse of power, it became known Geun Hye Park's regime not only made the conglomerate CJ group discontinue the Saturday Night Live television program that satirized Geun Hye Park, but also exerted pressure on CJ group's human resources to influence management position appointments within the company. This example shows thorough vindictive punishment was carried out against people who revealed the true nature of Geun Hye Park's regime by applying “charges that do not have anything to do with the regime.”  Like how in the dynasty era the suspicion of “having taken part in a conspiracy” was cast on everyone to cause a “purge” to happen and was used as an excuse to punish people, in Geun Hye Park's regime where she was called the “queen” by the masses, the suspicion of “having engaged in profit-seeking activity” that could easily incur hatred among people was used to discipline a company that could legitimately engage in profit-seeking activity and discipline a professor who had the right to freely research.

The attempt to discipline Sang Min Whang in 2015 was not the first time.  In 2014, he was sent to the disciplinary action committee for “lack of research production and negligence in teaching students,” but the charge fell apart after it was revealed not to be true.  This is because in 2014 when Sang Min Whang was sent to the disciplinary action committee, he did five presentations in international and domestic academic societies and published one dissertation and the book The Person That Is Me.  Also, he was on the editing staff for the Journal of Human Subjectivity and was editor-in-chief of the Korean Society for the Study of Human Subjectivity.  In the following year of 2015, he published "The New Consumer Psychology: Scanning buying behavior with MRI of the Mind" through Routledge, America's publishing company specializing in social sciences.  In addition, when the genital scandal arose, Sung Joo Kim who was the co-chair of the Presidential Campaign Committee for Saenuri party, visited Yonsei University demanding Sang Min Whang's resignation from professorship and revealed that she was promised disciplinary action by Yonsei University.  It was brought up that Sung Joo Kim may be a member of the hidden power organization called “eight fairies” related to the Soon Sil Choi scandal, but she denied the allegation.

Professor Chang Yong Kim, who asserts that he also experienced the dangers of disadvantages caused by criticizing the regime, criticized Yonsei University's actions against Whang and warned against the current danger the state of social sciences is in Korea and scholars’ freedom becoming limited by saying as follows:“He was easily terminated by the so-called “genital” comment even though he was a full professor who was guaranteed retirement (tenure).  If you look at it, what is wrong with this comment?  It was nothing more than an ordinary opinion, not degradation nor defamation. After being terminated, professor Whang appeared on a TV program and claimed, “I became an object of hatred after defining Geun Hye Park as a ‘foolish ruler’ and even if there was pressure to terminate me from the Blue House because of this, the faculty council and university president should have stepped forward acting as a shield saying it [my comment] is within academic domain. This is evidence that universities have become trash…”Even if a college professor is guaranteed retirement, he still has to assume risk when practicing the “freedom of expression” guaranteed by the constitution against political authority.  It is especially not easy to raise your voice of criticism against a living authority figure such as a president or a minister.… The constitutionally guaranteed “freedom of expression,” “freedom of the press, “academic freedom” are being threatened and even terminated or removed by thoughtless people.  When even the professorship is shaken by the outside wind, the freedom of expression in this country shrinks and praises like “it is sunny when the president appears” and sugar-coated reports become rampant in the media.As long as the president, who does not want to hear anything unpleasant to the ear and only wants to hear praise and glorification, and the people close to her do not change, then the pundit class does not speak out when the constitution is threatened and specifically when freedom of expression has been violated.”Sang Min Whang's research that became grounds for termination was “An Investigation into the President’s Image” that started in 2014.  It was shown the image the public has of the president can be divided into 8 types through this research.  The following is the body of the research explanation that was published in Shin Dong Ah.“To the public that perceives President Park as a ‘foolish ruler,’ she is like “a king that tries to privatize the country.”  Above all, she is an “incompetent and lazy” leader.  She is a person who does not take responsibility and only has the desire for power.  She cannot tolerate a competent subordinate and is strongly likely to engage in random behavior in order to maintain power.  So the public is anxious and fearful the foolish ruler may do something a senseless child might do.  Above all, to a foolish ruler, the people and the country is a means to satisfy her desires. She likely regards ‘the country=power=me.’ Even with this kind of presidential image, she is a fine enough leader for those who want to maintain conservative power.  She could even be a really needed leader if one’s gains or interests fit well together with the president.  However, the people who see President Park in the image of the foolish ruler has the thought “the country has been left to someone who is incompetent and causes uneasiness with the possibility she may do something preposterous.”  The public having this kind of image about the president does not, by any means, mean that “the president is this kind of person.” It just means some perceive the president as a foolish king.The more the public think the president is a foolish king, the more the image of the political leader they desperately want becomes the “great commander (strategist).” A great commander who torments and agonizes himself and at the same time tries to change society.  He may more or less fall short in taking actual action or combat because he is a strategist, but the public is satisfied with a leader who provides direction to keep the people from feeling confused.  It is the image of a leader who can tell us the tasks and crisis our society faces and can solve it together.  This kind of image stands out more when the uncertainty of the current situation becomes greater.”This research was made into PCIC (President Candidate Image Checklist) that diagnoses what kind of wish, desire, and belief people have of a particular politician and is being utilized as material that analyzes the public image of tentative presidential candidates in current event programs.

Genitals remark dispute 
Sang Min Whang appeared on the 219th episode of the television program “Gordian Knot” and discussed the phenomenon that Park, who was a presidential candidate at the time, was being advertised as the “first female president.”  In the episode, he argued the public is delusional to expect a mother like aspect from candidate Park who was raised only as a princess and did not marry or experience becoming a mother.  This is because in Korean society the life of a woman comes from having to perform a societal role, not from the genitals that are different from men.  After this episode was aired, many in the press including Kyunghyang Shinmun, SBS, Dailian, etc. released articles saying Whang remarked “Geun Hye Park is a woman only in her genitals” and there was hot debate on the internet on “how a professor could say something like ‘a woman only in her genitals?’”  As a result, the debate on candidate Park’s qualifications and tendencies as a leader moved onto value assessment and criticism on a remark made by a peculiar professor, and the question “is it possible for the people to expect candidate Park to demonstrate the role and capability of a woman in Korean society?” was not brought up again.  However, in the actual recording of Gordian Knot, the sensational line “Candidate Park is a woman only in her genitals” was not found and there was only a comment ‘that (the claim by anchor Jong Jin Park that at-the-time candidate Geun-hye Park also has femininity) is an issue of genitals (not) acting in the role of a woman…’

Sung Joo Kim, who was the co-chair of the presidential campaign committee of Saenuri party at the time, visited Yonsei University in protest and demanded Whang's resignation from professorship in relation to this incident and appeared on Hyun Jung Kim's news show and testified that she received a promise from Yonsei University to send Sang Min Whang to the disciplinary action committee.  Sung Joo Kim's comment that “Yonsei University promised sending Sang Min Whang to the disciplinary action committee” as she demanded Whang's resignation shows Yonsei University's decision to terminate Whang is not unrelated to the Geun Hye Park regime.

Sang Min Whang said “[I] did not [use the word “genitals” to] belittle women as a whole but used [the word] as an academic term to differentiate between societal role and biological difference,” but Sung Joo Kim retorted, “his action is one of not being able to distinguish things you should say and things you should not say.”  On this, Sang Min Whang analyzed if Sung Joo Kim “is idolizing candidate Park as a divine being and not as a person then it shows the state of mind as is that considers the word “genitals” as profane and blasphemous.”[Gordian Knot Episode 219 relevant section recording (Sang Min Whang / ●: Jong Jin Park)]Whang: When we say a woman is less corrupt than a man, in that instance is the difference between a woman and a man a difference in genitals or are we talking about a difference in how they live?
 Park: I don’t know about that. Anyways, there is almost no instance of an assemblywoman receiving bribes and having to go to the prosecutors’ office.  There is, of course, not a lot of assemblywoman.
Whang: Not long ago a person who was an assemblywoman from Saenuri party [said] to a small business CEO…
 Park: But there was no instance of taking a bribe.
Whang: There was no instance of taking a bribe because none was given.  If it was given, it would have been taken.
 Park: Anyhow
Whang: But do you know where the difference comes from when we say woman or man?
 Park: Mother has a more sacred feeling than father.
Whang: That is an excellent point.  In Korean society living as a woman, and a moment ago being able to be less corrupt and also being sacred because of being a woman, when we say that what does that woman mean?  Does it mean different genitals between a man and a woman or a difference in roles?
 Park: Of course, it is a difference in roles.
Whang: It is a difference in roles, right?  For example, what is one of the more representative roles?
 Park: Mother.
Whang; Mother.  Being a mother means having given birth to children, right?  In Korean society living as a woman does not mean being born with genitals different from man, but it means [a difference in] role, when does that most representative thing about that role appear?
 Park: Getting married and having children
Whang: And then raising children.  Isn’t being a woman a phenomenon that happens because of it?  When looking at that we say that person is a woman.  We don’t say she is a woman because her genitals are different from a man.  But is candidate Geun Hye Park in that situation?  Is she in a category that coincides with that woman or no?  Did candidate Geun Hye Park get married?  Did she give birth to children?  Did she raise children? 
 Park: But she still has femininity.
Whang: So that is an issue of genitals as a woman what role…
 Park: Still, as a woman wouldn’t there be maternal affection, as a woman?  [She] had not given birth to a child, but
Whang: So we speak of that person as a princess and it is right to see her as a queen who came out to become president.  Why then all of a sudden does [her being a] woman come up?  Even if I am a man, from women’s perspective with many women… I… Korean women are much more capable than men.

Criticism of college star athletes preferential treatment and Yuna Kim Show controversy 
Sang Min Whang who was a regular on CBS Radio’s “Mi Hwa Kim’s Everybody” program criticized colleges’ preferential treatment of its sports stars on May 22, 2012.<Sang Min Whang’s summarized speech from “Mi Hwa Kim’s Everybody” radio program, May 22nd, 2012>When did Yuna Kim go to college?  Do you go practice teaching as you graduate high school?  When we say diligence it means practicing an undertaking consistently well.  It is true athlete Kim (Yuna Kim) is busy but it does not mean she practiced teaching diligently.  If Yuna Kim goes to teaching practice, does it mean she fulfilled all the prerequisites to become a student-teacher by going to class assiduously for 4 years in college and received grades for completing courses?  Yuna Kim trains mainly abroad for personal or national work and goes around abroad.  Is Korea University a school that lets one graduate with no classes required?  We provide a lot of special benefits for sports stars exempting them from military service and paying them a lot of money. Either Yuna Kim’s parents or the school is teaching athlete Kim, who is trying to become a teacher, the wrong way. Yuna Kim receiving a certificate as if she is collecting them may be thought of as her just showing her face and receiving a certificate from a regular student-teacher’s position.  The college is using stars like Kim for marketing in order to make their name known among the public.  A college has given up being a college and stooped to the level of gaining publicity like a regular corporation.”Unlike Sang Min Whang's intention to discuss “Korean universities’ utilizing students as a means for gaining publicity and the preferential treatment of elite sports athletes,” he became embroiled in the controversy of “fact checking Yuna Kim’s teaching practice.”  A teacher from Yuna Kim's teaching practice site, Seoul Jinseon Girls' High School, refuted in an interview on “Mi-hwa Kim’s Everybody” to “please check the fact that [Yuna Kim] is coming to school and diligently coming to practice teaching” and on June 6 Yuna Kim's management company, All That Sports, sued Sang Min Whang for slander saying “there are parts of what he said that are untrue that he spoke of as if it were true and because that damages the athlete’s honor we are taking legal measures.”  However, they also left the possibility of dropping the lawsuit open by saying, “we can drop the suit at any time if professor Whang apologizes for the false information that was not checked.”

On the controversy surrounding his comments, Whang said “I think it is possible to specially grant college admission to any number of (star athletes).  But on whether the athletes receive a proper education while going to college, on whether colleges have a real interest in educating these students, right now they do not” and “they are only a means to gain publicity and the students grow up really as sports machines completely swayed by sports.  And when that student graduates from college is he or she really a person at the intellectual level of a person who graduated from a 4-year university? And later when [that person] does a masters or doctorate program and even becomes a professor in that field, we already saw through athlete Dae Sung Moon’s case how the dissertation is not written but copied from other sources” and “we discussed this issue from the perspective of psychological reasoning, from the side of let’s think about this aspect, but if [Yuna Kim] thought of this as talking about her and sues then who in Korea would raise questions about a problem or issue that makes us frustrated?”  Whang expressed his frustrations for having been weirdly attacked for trying to raise an educational issue.  He did not back down from his opinion saying, “I just called it as I saw it,” but apologized for the discomfort Yuna Kim may have felt being taken as an example and stepped down from the radio program “Mi Hwa Kim’s Everybody.”

Afterwards, Yuna Kim's side dropped the suit against Sang Min Whang saying “we do not want to be caught up in this anymore.”  However, the possibility was mentioned that this decision was made conscious of the potential controversy that may rise when the fact comes out that Yuna Kim cannot normally become a student teacher because she did not attend almost all of the undergraduate classes at Korea University if the defamation lawsuit progressed and the problem of “whether [Yuna Kim] went to teaching practice diligently” and “whether [Kim] has the qualifications to practice teaching” had to be proven.  Some compared Yuna Kim with ex-Tae Kwon Do athlete Dae Sung Moon's example and the opinions “raising national prestige itself does not give [star athletes] the right to skip school” and “this needs to be a starting point to face the inconvenient truth that we cannot foster ‘studying athletes’” were raised.

Life after dismissal 
At the end of 2016, the occurrence of "Geun Hye Park–Soon Sil Choi Gate" shed new light on Sang Min Whang's dismissal from Yonsei University in the press and in politics. He also took this time to reset his own values, which can be known from his words in the following: "If I could do what was enjoyable to me then I was not going to be concerned with anything else and tried hard to be indifferent and lived thinking "a professor's duty is only to do research."  I tried to live detached from the power struggle as an aloof scholar who would occasionally observe it from afar and provide advice.  But in Korea, after knowing the truth that I cannot do the work I enjoy and do well at all outside of its influence…  I realized the truth that I was terminated because my desire to stay as an aloof scholar was not as clear compared to those who tried to gain power who had very clear desires and was thorough in their pursuit of it.  So I thought I should no longer stay as an observer… The people were also deceived by Lee-Myung-Park-Geun-Hye because they did not face what they want and did not make it clear enough."  After diagnosing the Korean peoples' mind as being in "a state of slavery" in relation to the "Geun Hye Park–Soon Sil Choi Gate," Whang spoke out more proactively and clearly on his opinions in politics in the press and on his podcast after his dismissal, and is leading "the Korean Peoples' Psychological Independence Movement" with the public through the podcast Whangshimso.

References

Living people
South Korean psychologists
Harvard Graduate School of Arts and Sciences alumni
Pyeonghae Hwang clan
1962 births